Keeper of the Door is a 1919 British silent drama film directed by Maurice Elvey and starring Basil Gill, Peggy Carlisle and Hamilton Stewart. It was an adaptation of a 1915 novel by Ethel M. Dell.

Cast
 Basil Gill as Max Wyndham
 Peggy Carlisle as Olga Ratcliffe
 Hamilton Stewart as Nick Ratcliffe
 Marjorie Hume as Violet Campion
 George Harrington as Dr. Ratcliffe
 Ivo Dawson as J. Hunt Goring

References

External links

1919 drama films
British drama films
British silent feature films
1910s English-language films
Films directed by Maurice Elvey
Films based on works by Ethel M. Dell
Films based on British novels
British black-and-white films
Silent drama films
1910s British films